Freshwater sharks are sharks able to live in freshwater lakes and rivers, including:
 the river sharks, Glyphis, true freshwater sharks found in fresh and brackish water in Asia and Australia
 the bull shark, Carcharhinus leucas, which can swim between salt and fresh water, and are found in tropical rivers around the world.
  
A small number of freshwater fish cyprinids and catfish(which are bony fish and thus quite unrelated to sharks) are also commonly called "freshwater sharks", "sharkminnows" or simply "sharks", particularly in the aquarium fish trade:
 Balantiocheilos melanopterus – Bala shark, tricolor shark, silver shark
 Epalzeorhynchos – typical freshwater "sharks"
 Labeo – 
 Puntius denisonii – Roseline shark
 Pangasianodon hypophthalmus – Iridescent Shark
 Pangasius sangitwongsei – sometimes called Paroon Shark or Hi-Fin Shark in the aquarium trade

Cyprinidae
Sharks
Fish common names